Pedro Lenz (born 8 March 1965 in Langenthal) is a Swiss writer.

Life 
Lenz studied Spanish literature at the University of Bern. He has worked full-time as a writer since 2001.

He writes columns for several newspapers in Switzerland, including the Neue Zürcher Zeitung and WOZ Die Wochenzeitung. He is also active in Bern's spoken word scene, performing as part of the Hohe Stirnen ('high foreheads') group. He lives in Olten.

His 2010 novel Der Goalie bin ig – written in Swiss German – won several prizes and was translated into Scots by Donal McLaughlin under the title Naw Much of a Talker. The novel was made into a film  (English title: I Am the Keeper) that was a major winner at the 2014 Swiss Film Awards with seven nominations from which it won four trophies including Best Feature Film. The film, directed by Sabine Boss, is notable for its dialogue in Bernese German. The film played at the Locarno Film Festival in August 2014.

Works
 Die Welt ist ein Taschentuch. Gedichte von da, von dort und von drüben. X-Time, Bern 2002, .
 Momente mit Menschen. Ein Mosaik. 71 Portraits. Stämpfli, Bern 2002, .
 Tarzan in der Schweiz. Gesammelte Kolumnen zur gesprochenen Sprache. X-Time, Bern 2003, .
 Das Kleine Lexikon der Provinzliteratur. Bilger, Zürich 2005, .
 Plötzlech hets di am Füdle. Banale Geschichten. Cosmos, Muri bei Bern 2008, .
 Der Goalie bin ig. Roman. Verlag Der gesunde Menschenversand, Luzern 2010, .
 Tanze wi ne Schmätterling. Die Coiffeuse und der Boxer. Cosmos, Muri bei Bern 2010, .
 (Hrsg.) Carl Albert Loosli: Loosli für die Jackentasche. Geschichten, Gedichte und Satiren. Rotpunkt, Zürich 2010, .
 Liebesgschichte, Roman, Cosmos, Muri bei Bern, 2012, .
 I bi meh aus eine. Die bemerkenswerte Geschichte eines Emmentaler Siedlers. Cosmos, Muri bei Bern, 2012, .
 Radio. Morgengeschichten. Verlag Der gesunde Menschenversand, Luzern 2014, .
 Wienachtsgschichte – von Klaus Schädelin bis Pedro Lenz Cosmos, Muri bei Bern, 2014, .
 Fussball und andere Randsportarten (mit Etrit Hasler), Kolumnen aus der WOZ, WOZ Die Wochenzeitung, Zürich, 2014, .
 Der Gondoliere der Berge. Cosmos, Muri bei Bern 2015,

Works in English 
 Naw Much of a Talker, Translator Donal McLaughlin, Freight Books, 2013,

References

External links 
 

Swiss writers
1965 births
Living people
People from Langenthal